Dorothy A. Hogg is a retired lieutenant general of the United States Air Force who last served as the twenty-third Surgeon General of the United States Air Force and the first Surgeon General of the United States Space Force. Hogg serves as functional manager of the U.S. Air Force Medical Service. In this capacity, she advises the Secretary of the Air Force and Air Force Chief of Staff, as well as the Assistant Secretary of Defense for Health Affairs on matters pertaining to the medical aspects of the air expeditionary force and the health of Airmen.

Hogg entered the Air Force in 1983 and has commanded at the squadron and group level, and served as the deputy command surgeon for two major commands. She has deployed in support of operations Enduring Freedom and Iraqi Freedom.

Education
 1981 Bachelor of Science degree in Nursing, University of Southern Maine, Portland, Maine
 1987 Women's Health Nurse Practitioner, School of Healthcare Sciences, Sheppard Air Force Base, Texas
 1992 Master of Public Administration, Troy State University, Troy, Alabama
 1997 Master of Science in Nursing, Medical University of South Carolina

Awards and decorations

References

Year of birth missing (living people)
Living people
Place of birth missing (living people)
University of Southern Maine alumni
American women nurses
United States Air Force Nurse Corps officers
Troy University alumni
Medical University of South Carolina alumni
Female generals of the United States Air Force
Surgeons General of the United States Air Force
21st-century American women